Que Suenen los Tambores (English: Let the Drums Sound) is the sixteenth studio album by Puerto Rican singer and songwriter Víctor Manuelle, released on April 21, 2015, through Kiyavi Corp. and Sony Music Latin. It was produced by Arbise "Motiff" Gonzalez, and features a collaboration with Puerto Rican singer Raquel Sofía in one of the bonus tracks.

At the 16th Annual Latin Grammy Awards, the album was nominated for Best Salsa Music while "Agua Bendita" was nominated for Best Tropical Song. The album was also nominated for Best Tropical Latin Album at the 58th Annual Grammy Awards and won Tropical Album of the Year at the 2016 Latin Billboard Music Awards.

The album peaked at numbers 167 and 2 at the Billboard 200 and Top Latin Albums chart, respectively, it also topped the Tropical Albums chart, being Manuelle's eleventh number-one album in the list. Additionally, the album was certified gold in United States.

Background
The album consists of thirteen tracks plus two pop versions of two songs from the album as bonus tracks, it includes songs written by Manuelle himself, like "Algo Le Pasa a Mi Héroe (Canción a Mi Papá)" ("Something Happens to My Hero (Song to My Father)"), dedicated to his father who was diagnosed with Alzheimer's disease in 2006, as well as songs written by other composers like the title track, written by Osmany Ernesto Espinosa Morales and first released by Cuban singer Laritza Bacallao. Mainly a salsa album, it also incorporates sounds from urban music and vallenato, Manuelle said that with the album he wanted to "renovate a little the style of my salsa" to appeal to younger audiences, he also said that "the result was incredible, very energetic, without losing the essence of what salsa is".

Singles
The album spawned four singles, the title track was released as the first single on October 7, 2014, followed by "Agua Bendita" on February 24, 2015, and "Algo Le Pasa a Mi Héroe (Canción a Mi Papá)" on March 24, 2015, the two bonus tracks were later released as the fourth and fifth singles, "Agua Bendita (Versión Pop)" on May 4, 2015 and "No Quería Engañarte" on August 14, 2015. The first single "Que Suenen los Tambores" peaked at number 11 at the Hot Latin Songs chart, while "Agua Bendita" and "No Quería Engañarte" peaked at numbers 26 and 23, respectively. Additionally, "Que Suenen los Tambores", "Agua Bendita" and "No Quería Engañarte" topped the Tropical Airplay chart.

Critical reception

Thom Jurek from AllMusic gave the album four out of five stars, he wrote that "when taken together, all 13 tracks on Que Suenen los Tambores offer an ambitious, dizzying statement that combines everything the singer does best with wide-ranging ambition as he experiments with many rhythmic styles", he finished the review calling the album "one of the sharpest and most focused records of his career".

Track listing

Credits

Musicians

Charts

Certifications

References

2015 albums
Víctor Manuelle albums
Spanish-language albums